Seef Mall is the second largest mall in the Kingdom of Bahrain. Managed by Seef Properties, the mall is located in the Seef district of the capital city, Manama. It attracts an average of 25,000 visitors a day.

Location
Seef Mall is directly connected to Fraser Suites at the western end of the mall. The Al Aali Shopping Complex is located near the eastern end at the entrance near the Marks and Spencer store. To the south is the Shaikh Khalifa Bin Salman Highway. Beyond the highway to the south is The Bahrain Mall. To the southeast is the Bahrain International Exhibition & Convention Centre.

History
Seef Mall opened its doors in 1997 and attracts an average of 25,000 shoppers every day. In 2007, it was named by the Oxford Business Group as "Bahrain's most successful real estate venture to date". Capitalising on the mall's financial success, the Bahraini government sold its 48% stake of the parent company Seef Holdings in an IPO in April 2007, with favourable terms for Bahraini investors.

See also
 List of shopping malls in Bahrain
 Manama incident
 Visual tour of Seef Mall

References

External links
 Seef Mall website

Buildings and structures completed in 1996
Shopping malls established in 1997
1997 establishments in Bahrain
Shopping malls in Manama